{{Infobox drug
| drug_name = Phenserine
| type =
| IUPAC_name = (3aS,8aR)-1,3a,8-Trimethyl-1H,2H,3H,3aH,8H,8aH-pyrrolo[2,3-b]indol-5-yl N''-phenylcarbamate
| image = Phenserine.svg
| width = 
| alt = 
| caption = 
| pronounce = 
| tradename = 
| Drugs.com = 
| MedlinePlus = 
| licence_EU = 
| licence_US = 
| DailyMedID = 
| pregnancy_AU = 
| pregnancy_AU_comment = 
| pregnancy_US = 
| pregnancy_US_comment = 
| pregnancy_category = 
| legal_AU = 
| legal_AU_comment = 
| legal_BR = 
| legal_BR_comment = 
| legal_CA = 
| legal_CA_comment = 
| legal_DE = 
| legal_DE_comment = 
| legal_NZ = 
| legal_NZ_comment = 
| legal_UK = 
| legal_UK_comment = 
| legal_US = 
| legal_UN = 
| legal_US_comment = 
| legal_UN_comment = 
| legal_status = Investigational
| dependency_liability = 
| addiction_liability = 
| routes_of_administration = By mouth
| bioavailability = ~100% 
| protein_bound = 
| metabolism = liver
| metabolites = (−)-N1-norphenserine, (−)-N8-norphenserine, (−)-N1,N8-bisnorphenserine
| onset = 
| elimination_half-life = 12.6 minutes
| duration_of_action = 8.25 hours 
| excretion = renal or hepatic clearance 
| CAS_number = 101246-66-6
| CAS_supplemental = 
| ATCvet = 
| ATC_prefix = 
| ATC_suffix = 
| ATC_supplemental = 
| PubChem = 192706
| PubChemSubstance = 
| IUPHAR_ligand = 
| DrugBank = DB04892
| ChemSpiderID = 167225
| UNII = SUE285UG3S
| KEGG = 
| ChEBI = 
| ChEMBL = 74926
| NIAID_ChemDB = 
| PDB_ligand = 
| synonyms = (-)-Phenserine, (-)-Eseroline phenylcarbamate, N-phenylcarbamoyleseroline, N-phenylcarbamoyl eseroline
| chemical_formula = 
| C = 20
| H = 23
| N = 3
| O = 2
| charge = 
| molecular_weight = 337.4155
| SMILES = [H][C@]12N(C)CC[C@@]1(C)C1=C(C=CC(OC(=O)NC3=CC=CC=C3)=C1)N2C
| StdInChI = InChI=1S/C20H23N3O2/c1-20-11-12-22(2)18(20)23(3)17-10-9-15(13-16(17)20)25-19(24)21-14-7-5-4-6-8-14/h4-10,13,18H,11-12H2,1-3H3,(H,21,24)/t18-,20+/m1/s1
| StdInChI_comment = 
| StdInChIKey = PBHFNBQPZCRWQP-QUCCMNQESA-N
| density = 
| density_notes = 
| melting_point = 150
| melting_high = 
| melting_notes = 
| solubility = 
| specific_rotation = 
| INN = 
| licence_CA = 
| class = 
| Jmol = 
| sol_units = 
}}Phenserine (also known as (-)-phenserine or (-)-eseroline phenylcarbamate''') is a synthetic drug which has been investigated as a medication to treat Alzheimer's disease (AD), as the drug exhibits neuroprotective and neurotrophic effects.

The research of phenserine, initially patented by the National Institute on Aging (NIA), has been suspended since phase III of clinical trials in 2006, conducted right after the drug licenses were issued. The abandonment of the clinical trials led to disapproval by FDA. The retrospective meta-analysis of the phenserine research proposed that its clinical invalidation was arisen from methodological issues that were not impeccably settled before proceeding to the subsequent clinical phases.

Phenserine was introduced as an inhibitor of acetylcholinesterase (AChE) and demonstrated significant alleviation in numerous neuropathological manifestations, improving cognitive functions of the brain. The ameliorative mechanism involves both cholinergic and non-cholinergic pathways.

The clinical translatable doses of phenserine show relatively high tolerability and rarely manifest severe adverse effects. With respect to overdosing of the drug (20 mg/kg), a few cholinergic adverse effects were reported, including nausea and tremor which are not life-threatening.

An administration form of phenserine, (-)-phenserine tartrate, which exhibits high bioavailability and solubility, is taken by mouth. Phenserine and its metabolites can readily access the brain with high permeability across the blood-brain barrier and sustain to act for a long duration with the relatively short half-life. Posiphen ((+)-phenserine), the enantiomer of (-)-phenserine, is also a potential drug by itself or synergically with (-)-phenserine, to mitigate the progression of neurological diseases, mainly Alzheimer's disease.

History 
Phenserine was first investigated as a substitute for physostigmine which failed to satisfy the clinical standards for treating Alzheimer's disease, and developed into more compatible remedy. It was initially invented by Nigel Greig whose laboratory is affiliated with the National Institute on Aging (NIA) under the US National Institutes of Health (NIH) which subsequently released a patent of phenserine as an AChE inhibitor in 1995. During phase I in 2000, the supplementary patent regarding its inhibitory mechanism upon β-amyloid precursor protein (APP) synthesis was added. Following 6 years of phase I and II trials, Axonyx Corporation had licensed phenserine to Daewoong Pharmaceutical and QR Pharma (later adopted new corporation name, Annovis Bio) companies in 2006, which then planned to undertake phase III trial and merchandize the drug. However, the clinical deficits   ̶ representatively from a double-blinded, placebo-controlled and 7-month phase III trial which had been conducted on 377 mild to moderate Alzheimer's disease patients across Austria, Croatia, Spain, and UK   ̶ were discovered and no significance was exhibited for the drug efficacy. This led to the relinquishment of phenserine development, merely displaying its marketable potential.

Approval status 
Phenserine failed in phase III of Alzheimer's disease-aimed clinical trials and there has yet been no promise of the trial resumption since 2006. The methodological problems of trials are frequently speculated as the principal reason for the failure of FDA approval as well as the scarcity of Alzheimer's disease drugs. The underlying complications are generated by an inordinate variance in clinical outcomes and poor determination in optimal dosing.

Intra and inter-site variations were incurred by a lack of baseline evaluation and longitudinal assessment on placebo groups. This produced an inadequate power and, thus, appeared to have insufficient statistical significance. In light of the dose determination, the criteria for human subject engagement was not meticulously established before dosing and the effective dose range was not completely established in phase I and II, yet still persisting to phase III. Compared to other Alzheimer's disease drugs, such as donepenzil, tancrine and metrifonate, the clinical advancement of phenserine involves comparably high compliance in outcome measures and protocol regimentation on methods and the clinical phase transition.

Pharmacological benefits 
Phenserine was invented as the Alzheimer's disease-oriented treatment in particular, and also proven to have alleviative effects upon other neurological disorders, Parkinson's disease, dementia and amyotrophic lateral sclerosis. The administration of phenserine within the short delay of the disease onset was shown to diminish the severity of neurodegeneration and accompanying cognitive impairments. Its post-injury intervention at clinical translatable doses has been shown to significantly mitigate various neurodegenerative manifestations, preventing chronic deterioration in cognitive functions. The collective neuropathological cascades in the brain are either naturally occurring or provoked by mild or moderate traumatic brain injuries, such as concussion, diffuse axonal injury, ischemic and hypoxic brain injuries The traumatic brain injuries have been substantially examined and induced to form test groups in phenserine research. They are highly correlated with the onset of neurodegenerative disorders, precipitating cognitive, and behavioral impairments.

Phenserine was proven to mitigate the multiple cascades of neuropathology, triggered by traumatic brain injuries, via both cholinergic and non-cholinergic mechanisms.

Pharmacodynamics (mechanism of action)

Cholinergic mechanism 

Phenserine serves as an acetylcholinesterase (AChE) inhibitor which selectively acts on the acetylcholinesterase enzyme. It prevents acetylcholine from being hydrolyzed by the enzyme and enables the neurotransmitter to be further retained at the synaptic clefts. Such mechanism promotes the cholinergic neuronal circuits to be activated and thereby enhances memory and cognition in Alzheimer's subjects.

Non-cholinergic mechanism 

In clinical trials, phenserine was demonstrated to alleviate neurodegeneration, repressing the programmed neuronal cell death and enhancing the stem cell survival and differentiation. The alleviation can be achieved by increase in levels of neurotrophic BDNF and anti-apoptotic protein, Bcl-2, which subsequently reduces expressions of pro-apoptotic factors, GFAP and activates caspase 3. The treatment also suppresses the levels of Alzheimer's disease-inducing proteins which are β-amyloid precursor protein (APP) and Aβ peptide. The drug interaction with the APP gene mediates the expression of both APP and its following product, Aβ protein. This regulating action reverses the glial cell-favored differentiation and increases the neuronal cell output.

Phenserine also attenuates the neuroinflammation which involves the excessive activation of microglial cells to remove the cellular wastes from injury lesions. The accumulation of the activated glia near the site of brain injury is unnecessarily prolonged, stimulating the oxidative stress. The inflammatory response was significantly weakened with the introduction of phenserine, which was evidenced with discouraged expression of pro-inflammatory markers, IBA 1 and TNF-α. The disrupted integrity of the blood brain barrier by a degrading chemical, MMP-9, leading to neuroinflammation, is restored by phenserine as well.

The alpha-synucleins, the toxic aggregates resulting from the protein misfolding, are highly observed in Parkinson's disease. The drug therapy was proven to neutralize the toxicity of alpha-synucleins via protein translation, alleviating the symptoms of the disease.

Dosage 
Clinically, the translatable dose of phenserine was primarily employed within a range of 1 to 5 mg/kg where the unit calibration took account of the body surface area. This standard dose range was generally well tolerated in long term trials by neuronal cell cultures, animal models and humans. Increment in dosing by 10 mg/kg is still tolerated without instigating any physiological implication. The maximal administration of phenserine up to 15 mg/kg was reported in rats.

Overdose 
The dose of 20 mg/kg and above are appraised as overdosing in which cholinergic adverse effects ensue.

The symptoms of overdosing includes:

 Nausea
 Vomiting 
 Dizziness
 Tremors
 Bradycardia

Mild symptoms were notified in clinical trials but no other seriously considerable adverse effects were expressed. Tremor was also noted as one of the dose-limiting actions.

Chemistry

Pharmacokinetics 
Oral bioavailability of phenserine was shown to be very high, up to 100%. Its bioavailability was tested by computing the drug's delivery rate across the rat's blood brain barrier. The drug concentration, reached in the brain, is 10-fold higher than plasma levels, verifying phenserine as a brain-permeable AChE inhibitor.

Relative to its short plasma half life of 8 to 12 minutes, phenserine exhibits a long duration of action with the half-life of 8.25 hours in which the hindering effect on AChE is time-dependently faded. With the administration of phenserine, 70% or higher AChE inhibitory action in the blood was observed in preclinical studies and with systemic phenserine administration, the extracellular ACh level in the striatum increased up to three times. Through PET studies and microdialysis, the compound's brain permeability was able to be further elucidated.

Enantiomer (posiphen)  

(-)-Phenserine, generally referred to phenserine, acts as an active enantiomer for the inhibition of acetylcholinesterase (AChE) while posiphen, its alternative enantiomer, was comparably demonstrated as a poor AChE inhibitor.

In the history of posiphen research, several companies were interactively involved. In 2005, an Investigational New Drug (IND) application of posiphen was filed with FDA by TorreyPines Therapeutics while its phase I trial on animal models had been implemented by Axonyx. Axonyx and TorreyPines Therapeutics officially signed for their merger agreement in 2006 and licensed the drug to QR Pharma in 2008. The clinical trials of posiphen against Alzheimer's disease are still underway.

Interactions  
Currently, 282 drugs have been reported to make interactions with phenserine.

Current research 
A 5-year double blinded, donepezil-controlled clinical study for validation of Alzheimer's disease course modification using phenserine has been undertaken as from 2018, involving 200 patients in the UK and US. The study aims to reduce variation in AD therapeutic response between patients via optimal dose formulation.

References 

Alzheimer's disease research
Neuroprotective agents
Neurotrophic factors